Dimapur Government College, established in 1966, is the general degree college in Dimapur, of the Northeast Indian state of Nagaland. It offers undergraduate courses in arts and commerce and is affiliated to Nagaland University.

Departments

Arts and Commerce
Economics
Bengali
English 
Tenyidie
History 
Political Science 
Education
Commerce 
Philosophy
Hindi

Accreditation
The college is recognized by the University Grants Commission (UGC).

External links 

 Official Website

References

Colleges affiliated to Nagaland University
Universities and colleges in Nagaland
Dimapur
Educational institutions established in 1966
1966 establishments in Nagaland